Within Russian political parties, liberal parties advocate the expansion of political and civil freedoms and mostly oppose  Vladimir Putin. In Russia, the term "liberal" can refer to wide range of politicians—simultaneously to Thatcherism/Reaganomics-related pro-capitalism conservative politicians (they are related to 1990s shock therapy "liberal" reforms), to centre-right liberal politicians (as in European political spectrum) and to left-liberal politicians (as in the US political spectrum). The term "liberal democrats" is often used for members of the far-right nationalist party, the Liberal Democratic Party of Russia. There are Russian opposition and pro-government liberal political parties in Russia. Pro-government liberal politicians support Putin's policy in economics.

There are no liberal factions in Russian parliament at the moment. Centre-left liberalism was represented in the State Duma of Russian parliament by the Russian United Democratic Party "Yabloko" (7.86% in 1993 election, 6.89% in 1995, 5.93% in 1999). Pro-government liberalism was represented by the Our Home – Russia (10.13% in 1995 election), the liberal political party founded by Prime Minister Viktor Chernomyrdin. Centre-right liberalism was represented by the pro-capitalist party Democratic Choice of Russia (15.51% in 1993) and its successor, the Union of Right Forces (8.52% in 1999 election).
Yabloko and the Republican Party of Russia – People's Freedom Party are members of Alliance of Liberals and Democrats for Europe Party. Yabloko is also a member of Liberal International.

Liberalism in the Russian Federation

History
Liberalism emerged in Russia before the Russian Revolution and continued to develop among Constitutional Democrats such as Pavel Milyukov living in exile after 1917. After the fall of communism, several new liberal parties were formed, but only one of them Yabloko (Yabloko – Rosiyskaya Demokraticheskaya Partiya, a member of Liberal International) succeeded in becoming a relevant force. This is a left-of-center liberal party. The Union of Right Forces (Soyuz Pravykh Sil, a member of International Democrat Union) is a right-of-center liberal party. It can also be seen as a democratic conservative market party. In this scheme, the party is not included as liberal, being considered a democratic conservative party, but it can also be called liberal because of its pro-free-market and anti-authoritarianism stances. The so-called Liberal Democratic Party of Russia is not at all "liberal" – it is a nationalist, right-wing, populist party.

Yabloko (1993–)

1993: Diverse new political parties merged into the social liberal Yavlinksii-Boldyrev-Lukin electoral bloc, led by Grigorii Yavlinskii.
1994: The party is renamed Yabloko (Yabloko).
1995: The party is officially registered.
2003: The party is renamed Russian Democratic Party Yabloko (Rosiyskaya Demokraticheskaya Partiya/Российская Демократическая Партия Яблоко).

The Yabloko is a member of the Alliance of Liberals and Democrats for Europe Party and Liberal International.

Pro-Chernomyrdin and regional party (1995–2000)

Democratic Choice of Russia (1993–1999)

The Democratic Choice of Russia was a centre-right liberal pro-capitalist political party.

Union of Right Forces (1999–2008)

The Union of Right Forces was a Russian centre-right liberal opposition political party.

Pro-Vladimir Putin liberal projects

Solidarnost wide movement (2008–)

Solidarnost is a liberal democratic political movement founded in 2008 by a number of well-known members of the liberal democratic opposition, including Garry Kasparov, Boris Nemtsov and others from the Yabloko and former Union of Right Forces (which had just merged with two pro-Kremlin parties).

Republican Party of Russia – People's Freedom Party (de facto 2010–)

People's Freedom Party "For Russia without Lawlessness and Corruption" is a liberal democratic coalition founded in 2010 by opposition politicians Vladimir Ryzhkov, Boris Nemtsov, Mikhail Kasyanov and Vladimir Milov and their organisations Republican Party of Russia, Solidarnost, Russian People's Democratic Union and Democratic Choice. The RPR-PARNAS is a member of Alliance of Liberals and Democrats for Europe Party.

In 2012, the coalition merged into the officially registered Russian political party RPR-PARNAS (Republican Party of Russia – People's Freedom Party).

The RPR-PARNAS is a centre-right liberal opposition political party and it represented in regional parliament in Yaroslavl Oblast.

Mikhail Prokhorov's party

Russian Empire

Background
Mikhail Speransky is sometimes called the father of Russian liberalism. His ideas were discussed and elaborated by such 19th-century liberal republican radicals as Alexander Herzen, Boris Chicherin, and Konstantin Kavelin. Based on their ideals, various early 20th-century liberal parties evolved, the most important of them being the Constitutional-Democratic Party, headed by Pavel Milyukov.

From Liberation Union to Constitutional Democratic Party
1905: The Liberation Union (Soyuz Osvobozhdeniya) merged with the Union of Zemstvo-Constitutionalists (Soyuz Zemstev-Konstitutsionistov) to form the liberal Constitutional Democratic Party (Konstitutsiono-Demokraticheskaya Partya), formally known as the Party of Popular Freedom (Partiya Narodnoy Svobody), led by Pavel Milyukov.
1906: A faction forms the ⇒ Party of Democratic Reform
October 26 O.S., 1917: The party's newspapers were shut down by the new Soviet regime
November 28 O.S., 1917: Banned by the Soviet regime, the party went underground
1918-1920: Many party leaders were active in the White movement
1921-early 1930s: The party continued to function in exile, but slowly disintegrated

Union of October 17
1905: Conservative liberals formed the Union of October 17 (Soyuz Semnadtsatovo Oktyabrya) and became known as Octobrists.
1906: A left wing faction formed the ⇒ Party for Peaceful Renewal, the party develops to be the party of the landlords.
March 1917: Dissolved after the February Revolution.

Moderate Progressive Party
1905: National liberals established the Moderate Progressive Party (Umereno-Progresivnaya Partiya).
1907: Merged into the ⇒ Party for Peaceful Renewal.

Party of Democratic Reform
1906: A moderate faction of the ⇒ Constitutional Democratic Party formed the Party of Democratic Reform (Partiya Demokraticheskikh Reform).
1912: Merged into the ⇒ Progressive Party.

From Party of Peaceful Renovation to Progressist Party
1906: A left-wing faction of the Octobrists, together with dissidents of the Constitutional Democratic Party and of the Moderate Progressive Party, established the Party of Peaceful Renovation (Partiya Mirnovo Obnovleniya).
1912: Merged with the ⇒ Party of Democratic Reform into the Progressist Party (Progresivnaya Partiya), led by Georgy Lvov.
1917: Most of the party merged into the ⇒ Constitutional Democratic Party, some continued as the Radical Democratic Party (Radikal'no-Demokraticheskaya Partiya).

List of various liberal leaders
: Pavel Milyukov, Georgy Lvov, Boris Chicherin
: Andrei Sakharov

See also
History of Russia
Politics of Russia
Political parties in Russia

References

 
Russia
Political movements in Russia